The Haifa Subdistrict (قضاء حيفا, נפת חיפה) was one of the subdistricts of Mandatory Palestine. It covered the northern Mediterranean coast of regional Palestine, southwestern Galilee, and the Wadi Ara region. It was disintegrated after the British withdrawal from the area. Prior to and during the 1948 Arab-Israeli War around half of the Arab localities were depopulated or destroyed. The entire district was captured by Israel and most of its Arab defenders were composed of the Arab Liberation Army and local militias.

Its predecessor was Haifa Subdistrict, Ottoman Empire.

The subdistrict was transformed into Haifa District, divided into Haifa Subdistrict and Hadera Subdistrict under Israel.

Localities

See also
 Haifa District For Jewish localities established before 1947.

References

 Haifa
Subdistricts of Mandatory Palestine
History of Haifa
Geography of Haifa